Gannex is a waterproof fabric composed of an outer layer of nylon and an inner layer of wool with air between them. It was invented in 1951 by Joseph Kagan, a UK industrialist and the founder of Kagan Textiles Ltd., of Elland, which made raincoats. The company is now defunct. The mill occupied by the company was demolished in 2010. The raincoats were worn by a number of well known people.

References

John A. Hargreaves, "Kagan, Joseph, Baron Kagan (1915–1995)", Oxford Dictionary of National Biography, Oxford University Press, 2004 accessed 17 Dec 2006

Products introduced in 1951
Technical fabrics
Brand name materials
Textile companies of the United Kingdom
Companies based in Elland